Martin Jakš (born 6 September 1986 in Plzeň, Czechoslovak Socialist Republic) is a Czech cross-country skier who has competed since 2004. His best World Cup finish was third in a 3.3 km event in Italy in 2008. He also has two wins in the 4 × 10 km relay, earning them in 2007 and 2008.

His best finish at the FIS Nordic World Ski Championships was 22nd in the 15 km event at Liberec in 2009.

Cross-country skiing results
All results are sourced from the International Ski Federation (FIS).

Olympic Games
 1 medal – (1 bronze)

World Championships

World Cup

Season standings

Individual podiums
2 podiums –  (1 , 1 )

Team podiums

1 victory – (1 )
3 podiums – (3 )

References

External links
 
 
 

1986 births
Cross-country skiers at the 2010 Winter Olympics
Cross-country skiers at the 2014 Winter Olympics
Cross-country skiers at the 2018 Winter Olympics
Tour de Ski skiers
Sportspeople from Plzeň
Living people
Olympic cross-country skiers of the Czech Republic
Olympic bronze medalists for the Czech Republic
Olympic medalists in cross-country skiing
Czech male cross-country skiers
Medalists at the 2010 Winter Olympics